Pristimantis permixtus is a species of frog in the family Strabomantidae. It is endemic to Colombia where it is found on the Cordillera Occidental and the Cordillera Central in Antioquia, Caldas, Quindío, Risaralda, Tolima, and Valle del Cauca departments.

Description
The characteristics of this species are: a dark reticulation enclosing pale spots in the groin and the concealed surfaces of the thighs; distinct labial stripes and a distinct, superficial Tympanum; the eyelid and the heel either having nonconical or subconical tubercles; the absence of vocal slits in males and a polymorphic dorsal pattern.

Pristimantis permixtus is a moderately sized frog. Size varies between populations with southern populations being smaller.

Pristimantis permixtus is most similar to and been mixed with Pristimantis supernatis.

Habitat and conservation
Its natural habitats are cloud forests and sub-páramo shrubland. It also occurs in secondary forests and disturbed areas. It is a nocturnal species that occurs on low vegetation, up to 2 metres above the ground.

Pristimantis permixtus is an abundant, widespread, and adaptable species, and there are no major threats to it.

References

permixtus
Endemic fauna of Colombia
Amphibians of Colombia
Amphibians of the Andes
Amphibians described in 1994
Taxa named by John Douglas Lynch
Taxonomy articles created by Polbot